George Franklin Morris (April 13, 1866 – March 25, 1953) is a former United States district judge of the United States District Court for the District of New Hampshire.

Education and career

George Franklin Morris was born in Vershire, Vermont on April 13, 1866. He read law to enter the bar in 1891. He married Lula J. Aldrich on May 16, 1894, and they had one son.

He was in private practice in Lisbon, New Hampshire from 1891 to 1906, and in Lancaster, New Hampshire from 1906 to 1921. He was also the County Solicitor for Grafton County, New Hampshire from 1897 to 1901, and a member of the New Hampshire House of Representatives in 1905. In 1917, he was president of the New Hampshire Bar Association.

Federal judicial service

On October 20, 1921, Morris was nominated by President Warren G. Harding to a seat on the United States District Court for the District of New Hampshire vacated by Judge Edgar Aldrich. Morris was confirmed by the United States Senate on October 25, 1921, and received his commission the same day. He assumed senior status on April 30, 1943, serving in that capacity until his death March 25, 1953, in North Carolina.

References

1866 births
1953 deaths
Judges of the United States District Court for the District of New Hampshire
United States district court judges appointed by Warren G. Harding
20th-century American judges
United States federal judges admitted to the practice of law by reading law
People from Vershire, Vermont
People from Lisbon, New Hampshire
Members of the New Hampshire House of Representatives